The 14th Pan American Games were held in Santo Domingo, Dominican Republic from August 1 to August 17, 2003.

Medals

Gold

Men's Kumite (– 62 kg): Alexis Carbajal

Silver

Women's Kumite (– 58 kg): Molly Sánchez

Bronze

Women's Singles: Lorena Blanco
Women's Singles: Sandra Jimeno
Women's Doubles: Lorena Blanco and Valeria Rivera
Women's Doubles: Sandra Jimeno and Doriana Rivera

Men's Kata: Akio Tamashiro
Men's Kumite (– 80 kg): Jorge Strohmeier

Results by event

Athletics

Road

Field

Boxing

Swimming

Women's Competition

Triathlon

See also
Peru at the 2004 Summer Olympics

References

Nations at the 2003 Pan American Games
Pan American Games
2003